Charles Willard was an American golfer. He competed in the men's individual event at the 1904 Summer Olympics.

References

Year of birth missing
Year of death missing
Amateur golfers
American male golfers
Olympic golfers of the United States
Golfers at the 1904 Summer Olympics
Place of birth missing